Tridamus is the name of a deity attested from a single inscription on a sandstone altar from Roman Britain, found in Michaelchurch in present-day Herefordshire. The inscription reads:

'To the god Tridam(us), Bellicus gave (this) altar'

However, alternative readings of the rough-hewn inscription also exist, some of which have read Triv or Trivii for Tridam(us). The altar remains in St Michael's Church in Michaelchurch.

The name Tridamus may be derived from the Proto-Celtic *tri-damos meaning 'three-bovine one'.

References

Sources
British Museum, London, England
Lancaster museum, Lancaster, England
Newcastle Museum of Antiquities, Newcastle, England
Penrith Museum, Penrith, England
Verovicium Roman Museum, Housesteads Fort, Northumberland, England
York Castle Museum, York, England

Gods of the ancient Britons